KUWY (88.5 FM) is a classical music radio station licensed to Laramie, Wyoming, United States.  The station is currently owned by the University of Wyoming.

References

External links

UWY
Classical music radio stations in the United States
UWY
NPR member stations
Radio stations established in 1993
1993 establishments in Wyoming
UWY